Every Campus A Refuge (ECAR) was founded by Diya Abdo, who is the Lincoln Financial Professor of English at Guilford College, in September 2015. ECAR was inspired by Pope Francis' call on every parish to take in refugees, and animated by Guilford's history and Quaker testimonies. Every Campus A Refuge is based on the idea that university and college campuses have everything necessary to host refugees like housing, food, care, and skills to support them as they begin their lives in their new homes. Like the Pope's call on every parish to host one refugee family, ECAR calls on every college and university in the world to partner with their local refugee resettlement agencies to house refugees on campus grounds and assist them in resettlement. Since its inception, 10 campuses have joined with 8 campuses actively hosting refugees on their campuses. The active campuses include: Guilford College (the flagship campus), Lafayette College, Siena College, Old Dominion University, Russell Sage College, Wake Forest University, and Agnes Scott College. Inactive chapters include Denison University, Northampton Community College, and Rollins College. There are many other institutions who are in various stages of mobilizing to become ECAR chapters. ECAR also works with a number of resettlement campuses- universities which partner with local refugee resettlement agencies to host refugees on campus grounds and support their successful integration. Collectively, ECAR chapters have hosted dozens of refugee families from around the world, with the flagship Guilford College chapter hosting more than 80 as of spring 2022.

Mission & Vision 
ECAR Mission

Mobilize colleges and universities to host refugees on campus grounds and support them in their resettlement.

ECAR Vision

Transform the landscape of refugee resettlement and higher education by creating thousands of sustainable resettlement campus ecosystems.

Present activities 
Since January 2016, Guilford has hosted 53 refugees (clients of CWS) in campus houses and apartments; 26 of them have been children between the ages of 10 months and 17 years. The already-hosted refugees include two Syrian families that have successfully settled in Greensboro. Additionally, the campus has hosted refugees from Iraq, Sudan, Uganda, Rwanda, and the DRC. In fall 2017, the ECAR 16 credit minor pilots at Guilford College. The ECAR minor will include two mandatory classes, which are two credits each.  These courses will allow students to receive training from refugee resettlement agencies and volunteer for 40 hours with recently resettled families.  Also, students participate in 10–15 hours of Skype conversations with Syrian refugees and study topics related to forced displacement and immigration.  Along with the two required classes, students will also choose one course on causes of forced displacement, one on voices and perspectives of immigrants and refugees, and one on community organizing and advocacy.

Guilford College has dedicated a campus house to ECAR; the program will host a refugee family, which arrive through CWS, every semester.

Program 
Under this program, each refugee family is temporarily housed on campus grounds until they can resettle successfully in Greensboro. They are provided with free housing, utilities, Wi-Fi, use of college facilities and resources, and a large community of support in the form of the college campus and its friends. The daily work of hosting and assisting in resettlement is assigned by CWS, managed and overseen by the CWS case manager, and the ECAR program coordinator, and carried out by over 100 Guilford community volunteers who are trained and background checked by CWS.  These volunteers include Guilford students, alumni, faculty, administrators and staff; their spouses; faculty, student, and staff from nearby Bennett College; also local faith communities. New Arrivals Institute also trains the volunteers to provide ESL instruction to the hosted refugees.

Volunteers utilize their skills towards the common goal of supporting refugees and receive an experiential education on pressing global and local issues. Thus ECAR provides a place-based educational experience for its volunteers.  ECAR has expanded to other campuses, which are partnering with their local refugee resettlement agencies to host refugees, including Wake Forest University, Agnes Scott College, Rollins College, and Lafayette College, among others.  Princeton University, Brandeis University, Georgetown University, and the University of Maryland are also moving to become ECAR campuses.

Recognition 
The initiative has been recognized at the White House in the Sixth Annual President's Interfaith and Community Service Campus Challenge Gathering. It has been featured on NPR's All Things Considered, in The Washington Post, and the former State Department's Toolkit on how universities can help refugees. Every Campus a Refuge recently won the Gulf South Summit's 2017 Outstanding Service-Learning Collaboration in Higher Education Award, as well as the Washington Center's Civic Engagement in Higher Education Award for 2017. Guilford College and Every Campus A Refuge were invited to participate in the United Nations' Together Campaign and its Summit held on January 9, 2018. Along with nine other colleges and universities (from the U.S., the U.K., Brazil, Cyprus, Germany, and China), Guilford College signed the UN Together Campaign Action Charter pledging active support for refugees and migrants' safety and dignity.

References

External links 
 

Refugee aid organizations in the United States